Clarice Hanson (23 March 1911 – 23 December 1956) was a British gymnast. She competed in the women's artistic team all-around event at the 1936 Summer Olympics.

References

1911 births
1956 deaths
British female artistic gymnasts
Olympic gymnasts of Great Britain
Gymnasts at the 1936 Summer Olympics
Sportspeople from Bradford